Yuriy Yegoshyn (born 2 June 1985) is a Ukrainian swimmer who competed in the 2004 Summer Olympics and in the 2008 Summer Olympics.

References

1985 births
Living people
Ukrainian male swimmers
Ukrainian male freestyle swimmers
Olympic swimmers of Ukraine
Swimmers at the 2004 Summer Olympics
Swimmers at the 2008 Summer Olympics
European Aquatics Championships medalists in swimming
Universiade medalists in swimming
Universiade gold medalists for Ukraine
Universiade silver medalists for Ukraine
Universiade bronze medalists for Ukraine
Medalists at the 2003 Summer Universiade
Medalists at the 2007 Summer Universiade
21st-century Ukrainian people